We Sing. We Dance. We Steal Things. is the third studio album by American musician Jason Mraz, released on May 12, 2008. The album peaked at number three in the Billboard 200, making it Mraz's highest-peaking album at the time. Mraz took the name of the album from a work by the artist David Shrigley.

Background and production
Progress of the recording of the album has been documented on the YouTube series "Crazy Man's Ju-ju" which contain clips from San Diego and London, where most of the album was made. "I'm Yours" was the first single from the album and was made available on iTunes, Zune Marketplace and Amazon.com on February 12, 2008. The album features collaborations with James Morrison on the track "Details in the Fabric" and with Colbie Caillat on the track "Lucky".

The album was preceded by three EPs released at monthly intervals for a limited time. We Sing. was released on March 18. We Dance. was released on April 15. The third installment, We Steal Things., was released as part of a digital bundle through iTunes, JasonMraz.com and AtlanticRecords.com on the release of the album on May 13, 2008. Up to March 17, 2010, the album had sold 1,491,736 copies in the US. In 2016, the album was certified three times Platinum by the RIAA.

On November 18, 2008, the album was re-released with the name We Sing. We Dance. We Steal Things. Limited Edition. The re-released album is a three disc set that includes the original 12-track CD, the second disc includes the three EPs all on one disc, and the third DVD includes an unreleased full-band concert Live at the Highline Ballroom in New York, a 30-minute documentary titled "Here We Are" and a preview to Mraz's "a thousand things." Polaroid book. The packaging also includes a 20-page CD booklet with full lyrics and additional artwork.

Track listing

The Latin American and Spanish re-release of the album includes a Spanish version of the song "Lucky" which was recorded by Mraz and the Mexican singer Ximena Sariñana.

Critical reception

The album, overall, gained mixed to positive reviews. Commenting on the album's "pleasantly lightweight jams", "beachy guitars", "R&B horns" and "playful scat singing", Entertainment Weekly gave the album a B+.
In an overall positive review, Billboard said, "Mraz emerges even bolder than before on an album loaded with strings, horns, formidable grooves and a dozen songs dripping with mantra-like positivity."

AllMusic wrote, "The nice thing about the soulful shimmer of We Sing is that it's so slick that it's easy to ignore the gibberish spilling out of Mraz's mouth and just enjoy the sunny, easy sound."

PopMatters wrote that "the album sounds great, and Mraz knows what he is up to. Less clear, I think, is whether the razzle-dazzle wordsmith who loves his Eminem records is ready to truly enter the marketplace as a serious vocalist and a sober songwriter", giving the album a positive rating of seven out of ten overall.

Giving the album two-and-a-half out of five stars, Blender concluded that whether "pondering his parents divorce or describing intricate and delicate sex acts, Mraz's tasty tenor remains a modestly classy pleasure. But he's lost crucial cool."

Even less flattering, Uncut magazine said that "listening to [the album] is like being followed home by a puppy — initially cute and guilelessly affecting, but rapidly irritating". Writing for The Big Issue, Lianne Steinberg stated that "listening to this album is akin to being woken from a comfortable deep sleep by a circus clown with a water pistol full of warm urine", singling out the "terrible lyrics and hamfisted rhymes" for their "hilarity".

Personnel
 Jason Mraz – lead vocals on all tracks, guitar on all tracks

Additional personnel

 Martin Terefe – bass guitar on tracks 1, 2, 3, 4, 5, 6, 8, 9, 10, 11 and 12, piano on tracks 2 and 3, guitar on track 2, drums on tracks 6 and 11, choir vocals on track 8, production on all tracks
 Karl Brazil – drums on tracks 1, 4, 5 and 10
 Luke Potashnick – guitar on tracks 1, 4, 5, 6, 8 and 10
 Nikolas Torp Larsen – keyboards on tracks 1, 2, 3, 4, 5, 6, 7, 8, 10, 11, and 12, choir vocals on track 8
 Carlos Sosa – tenor saxophone on tracks 1, 4, 5 and 9, baritone saxophone on tracks 1, 4 and 9, flute on track 4, horn arrangements
 Fernie Castillo – trumpet on tracks 1, 4, 5, and 9, flugelhorn on track 4, horn arrangements
 Raul "Ralo" Vallejo – trombone on tracks 1, 4, 5 and 9, horn arrangements
 Noel "Toca" Rivera – backing vocals on tracks 1, 2 and 12
 Abby Scwartz – backing vocals on tracks 1 and 2
 Gianna Muir-Robinson – backing vocals on tracks 1 and 2
 Lauren De Rose – backing vocals on tracks 1 and 2
 Taylor-Tay – backing vocals on tracks 1 and 2
 Kristoffer Sonne – drums on tracks 2, 3, 8, 9 and 12
 Colbie Caillat – vocals on track 3
 David Davidson – violin on tracks 3, 6, 7, 11 and 12, string arrangements
 David Angell – violin on tracks 3, 6, 7, 11 and 12
 Kristin Wilkinson – viola on tracks 3, 6, 7, 11 and 12
 Keith Nichols – cello on tracks 3 and 12
 Judy Renea Flenoid – choir vocals on track 5
 Shardie Flenoid – choir vocals on track 5
 Karen Mills – choir vocals on track 5
 Betty Mills – choir vocals on track 5
 Chirell Warren – choir vocals on track 5
 Tanya Tolver – choir vocals on track 5
 Tanya Murphy – choir vocals on track 5
 Ida Rhem – choir vocals on track 5
 Sia Thompson – choir vocals on track 5
 Connie Corn – choir vocals on track 5
 Sacha Skarbek – piano on track 6, keyboards on track 9
 John Catchings – cello on tracks 6, 7 and 11
 James Morrison – vocals on track 7

 Bushwalla – voicemail message on track 7, backing vocals on track 12
 Andreas Olssen – synthesizer on track 8, 808 on track 10, programming on all tracks
 Aaron Leibowitz – saxophone on track 8
 Justin Kirk – trombone on track 8
 Ben Adamson – trumpet on track 8
 Noah Terefe – choir vocals on track 8
 Rita Ora – choir vocals on track 8
 Kiera McGuinness – choir vocals on track 8
 Olivia Ansah-Smith – choir vocals on track 8
 Julia Morgan – choir vocals on track 8
 Julia Cailleteau – choir vocals on track 8
 Kiera Zekra – choir vocals on track 8
 Teymor Gray – choir vocals on track 8
 Joseph Alfille-Cook – choir vocals on track 8
 Sofia Loopuit – choir vocals on track 8
 Walid Massoud – choir vocals on track 8
 Thomas Picard – choir vocals on track 8
 Hanna Terefe – choir vocals on track 8
 Tia Terefe – choir vocals on track 8
 Pete Ibsen – choir vocals on track 8
 Nick Whitecross – choir vocals on track 8
 Jon Hall – choir vocals on track 8
 Savanna Sparks – choir vocals on track 8
 Rebecca Lacey – choir vocals on track 8
 Zatac Sylwiz – choir vocals on track 8
 Xoreal Harrison – choir vocals on track 8
 Millet Oliver – choir vocals on track 8
 Jane Tomes – backing vocals on track 12
 Alexis Fedorowich – backing vocals on track 12
 Tricia Huffman – backing vocals on track 12
 Tony Maserati – mixing on all tracks
 Szyyd Drullard – mixing assistance on all tracks
 Adam Thompson – mixing assistance on all tracks
 Chris Gehringer – mastering on all tracks
 Bil Zelman – interior album photo

Charts

Weekly charts

Year-end charts

Certifications

References

External links
  – contains aforementioned "Crazy Man's Ju-ju" series

Jason Mraz albums
Atlantic Records video albums
Concert films
Live video albums
2008 video albums
2008 live albums
Atlantic Records live albums
2008 albums
Atlantic Records albums